Shaun Narain (born October 1, 1992) is a Canadian professional darts player who has competed in British Darts Organisation (BDO) events.

Career
In 2013, Narain won the Canadian Open by beating Bernie Miller in the final. In 2014 he reached the final of a PDC event for the first time at a Youth Tour event where he lost 4–2 against Dimitri van den Bergh. Narain also qualified for his first PDC major, the 2014 UK Open but he was beaten 5–4 by Mark Cox in the first round. Narain was now Canada's number two ranked player after John Part and together they teamed up to play in the World Cup of Darts, losing 5–4 to the Japanese pair of Morihiro Hashimoto and Haruki Muramatsu in the first round with Part missing three match darts and Narain missing four. A week later he faced Muramatsu again, this time in the final of the soft tip Dartslive event in France, with the Japanese player again prevailing. Narain also reached the final of the soft tip event in China, losing to Boris Krčmar. In the remainder of his PDC tournaments, Narain qualified for the European Darts Grand Prix and European Darts Trophy and was beaten in the second round of both.

After an unsuccessful Q School campaign, Narain only played in a handful of events in 2015.

References

External links

1992 births
Canadian darts players
Canadian emigrants to the United States
Living people
Professional Darts Corporation associate players
Sportspeople from Calgary
PDC World Cup of Darts Canadian team